Viresh Yadav is an Indian politician and a member of the 16th Legislative Assembly of India. He represented the Atrauli constituency of Uttar Pradesh and is a member of the Samajwadi Party political party.

Early life and  education
Viresh Yadav was  born in Aligarh district. He attended the Aligarh Muslim University and attained Bachelor of Arts degree.

Political career
Viresh Yadav has been a MLA for three terms. He represented the Atrauli constituency and is a member of the Samajwadi Party political party.

Yadav lost his seat in the 2017 Uttar Pradesh Legislative Assembly election to Sandeep Singh of the Bharatiya Janata Party.

Posts held

See also
 Atrauli (Assembly constituency)
 Sixteenth Legislative Assembly of Uttar Pradesh
 Uttar Pradesh Legislative Assembly

References 

Samajwadi Party politicians
Uttar Pradesh MLAs 2012–2017
Uttar Pradesh MLAs 2002–2007
Uttar Pradesh MLAs 1993–1996
People from Aligarh district
1965 births
Living people